The harmless serotine (Eptesicus innoxius) is a species of vesper bat. It has a restricted range in western Ecuador and northwestern Peru. An insectivorous species, it is a resident of tropical dry forest habitat, and is threatened by deforestation.

References

Eptesicus
Bats of South America
Mammals of Ecuador
Mammals of Peru
Mammals described in 1841
Taxa named by Paul Gervais